State Road 11 (SR 11) is a north–south route in Flagler and Volusia Counties, running from US 17 north of DeLand to US 1 in Bunnell.

Route description
State Road 11 begins at US 17 near Lake Molly in northern DeLand as a one-way street until it reaches Glenwood Road which is also part of SR 11 east of US 17. The road takes a slight curve to the right where it passes a former segment known as Old Perkins Highway, then curves back north. It briefly becomes a two-lane divided highway as it intersects with CR 15A, where southbound access to that route contains a long south-to-west turning ramp, and a short east-to-south turning ramp.

Throughout much of its existence, SR 11 serves as the western border for the Tomoka Wildlife Management Area Union-Camp Tract. This includes three other former sections of the road, the first of which is used by Lake Dias Park and diagonally across from the north end of that, a private driveway that was once part another segment of Old Perkins Highway. The north end of that segment of Old Perkins Highway is encountered later on. Telephone poles along the road veer to the right along yet another former section of the road just south of the point where it intersects with State Road 40 in DeLeon Springs. The road takes one last curve to the northeast and becomes Moody Boulevard as it enters Bunnell. It passes by the Old Bunnell State Bank Building near the crossing of the Florida East Coast Railway main line before it finally terminates at US 1 and State Road 100. Here, Moody Boulevard continues onto SR 100 which is the southern terminus of the US 1/SR 100 overlap.

Major intersections

References

External links

Florida Route Log (SR 11)

011
011
011